Durkee  may refer to:

Groups, organizations, companies
Durkee (food business) is an American brand name under conglomerate ownership. It formerly was an independent food company, Durkee Famous Foods, founded by Eugene R. Durkee in 1851.
Durkee Marine, former Staten Island marine hardware company

People
Charles Durkee (1805–1870), American politician from Wisconsin
Charlie Durkee (born 1944), placekicker for the New Orleans Saints
Sarah Durkee, singer-songwriter
William Durkee Williamson (1779–1846), American politician from Maine
Will Durkee (born c. 1983), poker player

Characters
Reese Durkee, fictional character on the soap opera Passions

Other uses
Durkee, Oregon, USA; an unincorporated community in Baker County

See also